Bintou Koité (born 20 November 1995) is a Malian international footballer who plays as a midfielder for the Mali women's national football team. She competed for Mali at the 2018 Africa Women Cup of Nations, playing in one match.

References

External links

1995 births
Living people
Malian women's footballers
Women's association football midfielders
Mali women's international footballers
Malian expatriate footballers
Malian expatriate sportspeople in Morocco
Expatriate footballers in Morocco
21st-century Malian people